Kelvin Wilbert Madzongwe (born 5 January 1990) is a Zimbabwean professional footballer who plays as a defensive midfielder for the Zimbabwean club F.C. Platinum, and the Zimbabwe national team.

Career
Madzongwe began his career as a footballer in Zimbabwe with Bulawayo Chiefs, Njube Sundowns and Chicken Inn. He was scouted by the Boston University Terriers, and from 2010 to 2014 studied Communications and Marketing relations at Boston University while playing for their university side. He returned to Zimbabwe to continue his football career, where he played for Bulawayo City and F.C. Platinum.

International career
Takwara made his international debut with the Zimbabwe national team in a 3–1 2020 African Nations Championship qualification win over Mauritius on 4 August 2019. He was part of the Zimbabwe squad the 2021 Africa Cup of Nations.

Honours
F.C. Platinum
Zimbabwe Premier Soccer League: 2018, 2019

References

External links
 
 
 Go Terriers Profile

1990 births
Living people
Zimbabwean footballers
Zimbabwe international footballers
Zimbabwe Premier Soccer League players
Boston University Terriers men's soccer players
Association football midfielders
2021 Africa Cup of Nations players
Zimbabwean expatriate footballers
Zimbabwean expatriates in the United States
Expatriate soccer players in the United States